Wickliffe is an unincorporated community in Patoka Township, Crawford County, Indiana.

History
Wickliffe had a post office between 1842 and 1952. According to one source, it was named for John Wycliffe.

Geography

References

Unincorporated communities in Crawford County, Indiana
Unincorporated communities in Indiana